Robert Purdie (18 February 1911 – 9 July 1982) was a New Zealand boxer who represented his country at the 1932 Olympic Games in Los Angeles.

Biography
Born in Glasgow, Scotland, in 1911, Purdie won three New Zealand national boxing titles, in the featherweight division in 1930 and 1931, and the lightweight division in 1932. In 1930 he won the Jamieson Belt for the most scientific boxer at the national championships. 

In 1932, Purdie was one of three New Zealand boxers to compete at the Olympic Games in Los Angeles. Fighting in the lightweight division, Purdie controversially lost his first round fight to the Italian, Mario Bianchini.

Purdie died in 1982, and he was cremated at Purewa Crematorium in Auckland.

References

1911 births
1982 deaths
Boxers from Glasgow
British emigrants to New Zealand
Lightweight boxers
Featherweight boxers
Olympic boxers of New Zealand
Boxers at the 1932 Summer Olympics
New Zealand male boxers